Xiangcheng may refer to:

People
Princess Xiangcheng (?–651 CE), daughter of Emperor Taizong of Tang

Locations in China
Xiangcheng City, Henan
Xiangcheng County, Henan
Xiangcheng County, Sichuan
Xiangcheng District, Suzhou, Jiangsu
Xiangcheng District, Xiangyang, Hubei
Xiangcheng District, Zhangzhou, Fujian
Xiangcheng, Jiangxi, subdivision of Gao'an, Jiangxi
Xiangcheng, Cangshan County, subdivision of Cangshan County, Shandong
Xiangcheng, Zoucheng, subdivision of Zoucheng, Shandong

Other
Xiāngchéng (香橙), also known as yuzu, a type of citrus fruit